Trachypteris picta is a species of beetles in the family Buprestidae, the only species in the genus Trachypteris.

References

Buprestidae